Moosetape is the third and final studio album by Indian singer, rapper and songwriter Sidhu Moose Wala, released on 15 May 2021. Moose Wala served as executive producer and writer, while the tracks were produced by The Kidd, Steel Banglez, Snappy, Wazir Patar, and JB. At 32 tracks, it is Moose Wala's longest album, and is also the last to be released before his death on May 29, 2022. It features guest appearances from Bohemia, Tion Wayne, Stefflon Don, Morrisson, Divine, Raja Kumari, Blockboi Twitch and Sikander Kahlon.

Background 
The album was announced by Sidhu Moose Wala on 10 March 2021, on his official Instagram account. 

On 26 April 2021, Moose Wala gave a challenge of five million comments on Instagram post, to release a teaser and release date of the album. On 28 April 2021, five million comments were completed and Moose Wala released the teaser of the album on his YouTube channel on 29 April 2021, with its release date. The teaser was viewed over a million times within twelve hours of its release. On 5 May 2021, Moose Wala released the trailer of the album.

Moose Wala started releasing the tracks one by one from 15 May 2021; they were scheduled to release until 21 July. On 18 May 2021, he released the bonus track "Unfuckwithable" featuring Afsana Khan, which was produced by The Kidd. Its music video was directed by Teji Sandhu.

Posthumously, the track "295" charted at 154 on the Billboard Global 200, making Moose Wala the first Punjabi singer to do so. The song was heavily played after his death as the song title surprisingly highlights the date of his death.

Track listing

Personnel 

 Sidhu Moose Wala – vocals, writer, executive producer
 Bohemia – featured artist
 Divine – featured artist
 Stefflon Don – featured artist
 Sikander Kahlon – featured artist
 Raja Kumari – featured artist
 Morrisson – featured artist
 Blockboi Twitch – featured artist
 Tion Wayne – featured artist
 Afsana Khan - featured artist
 Preet Aujla – actor
 Sonam Bajwa – actor
 Sara Gurpal – actor
Jumana Khan – actor

Technical personnel 

 Steel Banglez – producer
 Dense – engineer
 The Kidd – producer
 Wazir Patar – producer
 Snappy – producer
 Dense – mixing & mastering all tracks from Moosetape except "Calaboose"
Bauss-P – mixing & mastering for track "Calaboose"
 FlutePreet Singh - flute programing for tracks 18 & 26

Music videos and directors 

➡ Sukh Sanghera 
 US
 Brown Shortie
 G-Shit
 IDGAF
 Power
 GOAT.
➡Tru-Makers
 Calaboose 
➡Teji Sandhu
 Burberry
 Unfuckwithable
➡ Raf-Saperra
 Signed To God
 Celebrity Killer
➡ Jashan Narrah
 Me and My Girlfriend
➡ Hunny Pk Films
 Malwa Block
➡ Navkaran Brar
 Audio visual artist

Promotion

Tour

On July 4, Moose Wala announced the Moosetape Tour officially on his Insta Live with the name Moosetape World Tour, and regions including North America, UK, Canada, Dubai, Australia and Pakistan.

On 17 April 2022, Moose Wala officially announced the Back To Business World Tour with Sunny Malton as a supporting act.

Virtual experiences
On 10 June 2021, Moose Wala collaborated with music streaming app Spotify, hosted by Vishnu Kausal. Actress Sonam Bajwa also joined the live session.

Charts

Album

Singles

References 

2021 albums
Sidhu Moose Wala albums